Emanuel Mateo Carreira (born 21 May 1987) is an Argentine professional footballer who plays as a midfielder.

Career
Carreira's career began with Temperley. After debuting professionally in 2006, the midfielder went on to feature one hundred and twenty-two times for the club across six seasons; whilst also netting four goals, the first of which came against Atlanta on 7 April 2009. In June 2013, Carreira switched Temperley for fellow third tier outfit Tristán Suárez. His first appearance arrived in a victory over Brown on 11 September, while his first goals came in his final two games of 2012–13 versus Acassuso and Los Andes. On 14 January 2015, Carreira signed for Colegiales. One goal in thirty-six fixtures followed across two campaigns with the team.

Carreira completed a move to Platense of Primera B Metropolitana in 2016. In his second year, 2017–18, they won promotion as champions to Primera B Nacional; he had participated thirty-four times for them. In January 2020, having not played for Platense since March 2018, Carreira rejoined Colegiales.

Career statistics
.

Honours
Platense
Primera B Metropolitana: 2017–18

References

External links

1987 births
Living people
People from Lomas de Zamora
Argentine footballers
Association football midfielders
Primera B Metropolitana players
Club Atlético Temperley footballers
CSyD Tristán Suárez footballers
Club Atlético Colegiales (Argentina) players
Club Atlético Platense footballers
Sportspeople from Buenos Aires Province